Stephanie Rehe was the defending champion but lost in the quarterfinals to Gigi Fernández.

Anne Minter won in the final 2–6, 6–4, 6–3 against Mercedes Paz.

Seeds
A champion seed is indicated in bold text while text in italics indicates the round in which that seed was eliminated.

  Stephanie Rehe (quarterfinals)
  Patty Fendick (first round)
  Bettina Fulco (second round)
  Anne Minter (champion)
  Neige Dias (semifinals)
  Gretchen Magers (quarterfinals)
  Mercedes Paz (final)
  Gigi Fernández (semifinals)

Draw

References
 1988 Honda Classic Draw

Puerto Rico Open (tennis)
1988 WTA Tour